The Seetal railway line is a  (standard-gauge) railway of the Swiss Federal Railways between Lenzburg and Lucerne in Switzerland. The line was opened in 1883 by the Lake Valley of Switzerland Railway Company, which was owned by British investors, and subsequently owned by the Schweizerische Seethalbahn-Gesellschaft (SthB). 

As built, the line had many of the characteristics of a roadside tramway, following the parallel road almost throughout and running within the villages, separating houses from the road. Despite rebuilding to improve its safety record, much of this nature has survived to the current day.

History

Inception 

In the communities of the Seetal valley, it was hoped initially that the main line from Basel to Lucerne would be routed through the valley, but the Swiss Central Railway opted for a route via Zofingen, Sursee and Sempach. At around the same time, the engineer Theodor Lutz developed a concept for the construction of local railways. According to his ideas, these railways should share the use of existing roads, which would anyway lose the most traffic at the newly opened railway. In addition, this allowed the introduction of the local train directly into the town centers.

Lutz managed to raise finance from investors in London to put his ideas into practice on a line through the Seetal. On 22 August 1882 the Lake Valley Railway Company of Switzerland was established in London.
 
On September 3, 1883, the first section was opened. The passengers included tourists from Lucerne doing sightseeing tours to the Hallwilersee and Baldeggersee lakes. Expansions of the main line followed, as well as a short branch line between Beinwil and Beromünster.

Changes of ownership 

The profitable expectations of the British investors were not fulfilled, and so they sold the line in 1894 to the newly founded Schweizerische Seethalbahn Aktiengesellschaft (SthB). They made various improvements, including the introduction of restaurant carriages. They were also pioneers of the electrification of Switzerland's railways, starting electric service in 1910 with 5.5 kV 25 Hz AC. Despite their efforts, the line remained unprofitable.

In 1922 the line was acquired by the Swiss Confederation and incorporated into the Swiss Federal Railways (SBB). In 1997 the branch line between Beinwil and Beromünster was closed down. It now forms part of a cycle path.

Rebuild 

By the end of the 20th century, the Seetalbahn had by far the worst safety record of all SBB lines. Between 1987 and 1992 the line accounted for around half of all the SBB's level crossing accidents and there were nine fatalities on the line. Improvement of safety was therefore a major target for the line.

Although the line's infrastructure had many of the attributes of a roadside tramway or light railway, it was operated using standard heavy rail rolling stock, with its greater width and longer stopping distances. Various options were investigated, including a major realignment of the line to more conventional heavy rail standands, but this had the twin disadvantages of a very high cost coupled with losing the attractiveness of bringing public transport to the hearts of the villages along the line.

Conversion to light rail was also discussed, and a vehicle from the Saarbrücken tramway was tried out on the line in 1998. In the end, the decision was made to build new heavy rail railcars for the line, but to build these with low floors and using a limited  width. The reduction in width allowed the infrastructure on the northern section of the line, between Lenzburg and Hitzkirch, to be reconfigured providing more space between parallel road lanes and at level crossings. 

Other parts of the line were realigned to avoid conflict and as many level crossings as possible were removed.

Operation 

The southern section, from Lucerne to Hitzkirch, still has a normal profile, allowing freight and other traffic to operate.

This variant was specially created for the Seetal line, although it is cleared to operate anywhere on the SBB network. The passenger service on the line operates every half-hour, and is designated as service S9 of the Lucerne S-Bahn.

References

External links 
 

Railway lines in Switzerland
Railway lines opened in 1883
Swiss Federal Railways lines
15 kV AC railway electrification